The 1973 Central Michigan Chippewas football team represented Central Michigan University as an independent during the 1973 NCAA Division II football season. In their seventh season under head coach Roy Kramer, the Chippewas compiled a 7–4 record and outscored their opponents, 197 to 151. The team played its home games in Perry Shorts Stadium in Mount Pleasant, Michigan, with attendance of 78,547 in five home games.

The team's statistical leaders included quarterback Mike Franckowiak with 655 passing yards, running back Jim Sandy with 1,168 rushing yards, and Matt Means with 553 receiving yards. Sandy received the team's most valuable player award. George Duranko set a school record with a 100-yard interception return against Eastern Michigan on November 10, 1973.

Schedule

References

Central Michigan
Central Michigan Chippewas football seasons
Central Michigan Chippewas football